A Time for Justice is a 1994 American short documentary film produced by Charles Guggenheim. In 1995, it won an Oscar for Documentary Short Subject at the 67th Academy Awards.

Summary
The 38-minute film, narrated by Julian Bond and featuring John Lewis, presents a short history of the Civil Rights Movement using historical footage and spoken accounts of participants. Events recounted are the Montgomery bus boycott; school integration in Little Rock, Arkansas; demonstrations in Birmingham; and the 1965 Selma to Montgomery march for voting rights. The film was produced by Guggenheim for the Southern Poverty Law Center.

See also
 Civil rights movement in popular culture

References

External links
A Time for Justice at Teaching Tolerance, Southern Poverty Law Center

1994 documentary films
1994 films
1994 short films
1994 independent films
1990s short documentary films
American short documentary films
American independent films
Best Documentary Short Subject Academy Award winners
Documentary films about the civil rights movement
Films directed by Charles Guggenheim
Southern Poverty Law Center
1990s English-language films
1990s American films